Krumegg is a former municipality in the district of Graz-Umgebung in the Austrian state of Styria. Since the 2015 Styria municipal structural reform, it is part of the municipality Sankt Marein bei Graz.

Geography
Krumegg lies about 15 km east of Graz in the east Styrian hills.

Subdivisions
Katastralgemeinden are Brunn, Dornegg, Kocheregg, Hohenegg, Prüfing, Kohldorf, Pirkwiesen, and Krumegg-Ort.

References

Cities and towns in Graz-Umgebung District